William Henry Lange (January 12, 1928 – April 7, 1995) was an American football offensive guard who played five seasons in the National Football League (NFL) with the Los Angeles Rams, Baltimore Colts and Chicago Cardinals. He was drafted by the Los Angeles Rams in the 30th round of the 1950 NFL Draft. He played college football at the University of Dayton and attended St. Rose High School in Lima, Ohio.

References

External links
Just Sports Stats

1928 births
1995 deaths
Players of American football from Ohio
American football offensive guards
Dayton Flyers football players
Los Angeles Rams players
Baltimore Colts players
Chicago Cardinals players
People from Delphos, Ohio